Subhra Guha (born 1956) is a vocalist in the Hindustani classical music tradition from the Agra gharana style of singing. Her repertoire covers khyals, thumri and dadra.

Biography 
Subhra Guha was born in Calcutta in 1956. Her family encouraged her to pursue Hindustani classical music, as she showed talent in music from a young age. Initially, she learnt music under Satish Bhowmick. From 1970, she trained in singing in Agra gharana style under Sunil Bose. From 1982, for ten years, she was a student at the ITC Sangeet Research Academy in Kolkata where she was taught by K. G. Ginde and Bhowmick. She learned thumri rendition from D. T. Joshi. In spite of the macho nature of the Agra gharana style of music, with her own sense of layakari (rhythmic play) and strong tone, she became proficient by creating her own style of gayaki under the guidance of Vijay Kichlu, director of the academy. She joined the academy as guru and taught between 1992 and 2003 and again in recent years. She is the only woman student of the Academy to be appointed as a guru in the same institution.

Guha has performed in many concerts nationally and also in the US, Europe, and Asia. She has recorded albums for HMV and many other recording companies. She recorded playback music for Goutam Ghoses film, Yatra. She performs regularly on All India Radio and Doordarshan. She is also known for her Poorab Ang renditions of thumri.

Awards
In 2015, Guha received the Girija Shankar Smriti Puruskar award from the Government of West Bengal.

References

1956 births
Hindustani singers
Indian women classical singers
Singers from Kolkata
Living people
Women Hindustani musicians
20th-century Indian singers
20th-century Indian women singers
21st-century Indian singers
21st-century Indian women singers
20th-century Khyal singers
Recipients of the Sangeet Natak Akademi Award